In mathematics, a Sobolev space is a vector space of functions equipped with a norm that is a combination of Lp-norms of the function together with its derivatives up to a given order. The derivatives are understood in a suitable weak sense to make the space complete, i.e. a Banach space. Intuitively, a Sobolev space is a space of functions possessing sufficiently many derivatives for some application domain, such as partial differential equations, and equipped with a norm that measures both the size and regularity of a function.

Sobolev spaces are named after the Russian mathematician Sergei Sobolev. Their importance comes from the fact that weak solutions of some important partial differential equations exist in appropriate Sobolev spaces, even when there are no strong solutions in spaces of continuous functions with the derivatives understood in the classical sense.

Motivation

In this section and throughout the article  is an open subset of 

There are many criteria for smoothness of mathematical functions. The most basic criterion may be that of continuity. A stronger notion of smoothness is that of differentiability (because functions that are differentiable are also continuous) and a yet stronger notion of smoothness is that the derivative also be continuous (these functions are said to be of class  — see Differentiability classes). Differentiable functions are important in many areas, and in particular for differential equations. The Sobolev spaces are the modern replacement for these spaces in which to look for solutions of partial differential equations.

Quantities or properties of the underlying model of the differential equation are usually expressed in terms of integral norms. A typical example is measuring the energy of a temperature or velocity distribution by an -norm. It is therefore important to develop a tool for differentiating Lebesgue space functions.

The integration by parts formula yields that for every , where  is a natural number, and for all infinitely differentiable functions with compact support 

where  is a multi-index of order  and we are using the notation:

The left-hand side of this equation still makes sense if we only assume  to be locally integrable. If there exists a locally integrable function , such that

On the other hand, if , then the classical and the weak derivative coincide.

For example, the function

is not continuous at zero, and not differentiable at −1, 0, or 1. Yet the function

The Sobolev spaces  combine the concepts of weak differentiability and Lebesgue norms.

Sobolev spaces with integer k

One-dimensional case
As mentioned above, some care must be taken to define derivatives in the proper sense. In the one-dimensional problem it is enough to assume that the -th derivative  is differentiable almost everywhere and is equal almost everywhere to the Lebesgue integral of its derivative (this excludes irrelevant examples such as Cantor's function).

With this definition, the Sobolev spaces admit a natural norm,

One can extend this to the case , with the norm then defined using the essential supremum by

Equipped with the norm  becomes a Banach space. It turns out that it is enough to take only the first and last in the sequence, i.e., the norm defined by

is equivalent to the norm above (i.e. the induced topologies of the norms are the same).

The case 
A special notation has arisen to cover this case, since the space is a Hilbert space:

The space  can be defined naturally in terms of Fourier series whose coefficients decay sufficiently rapidly, namely,

As above, one can use the equivalent norm

Furthermore, the space  admits an inner product, like the space  In fact, the  inner product is defined in terms of the  inner product:

The space  becomes a Hilbert space with this inner product.

Other examples
In one dimension, some other Sobolev spaces permit a simpler description. However, these properties are lost or not as simple for functions of more than one variable.

Multidimensional case
The transition to multiple dimensions brings more difficulties, starting from the very definition. The requirement that  be the integral of  does not generalize, and the simplest solution is to consider derivatives in the sense of distribution theory.

A formal definition now follows. Let  The Sobolev space  is defined to be the set of all functions  on  such that for every multi-index  with  the mixed partial derivative

exists in the weak sense and is in  i.e.

That is, the Sobolev space  is defined as

The natural number  is called the order of the Sobolev space 

There are several choices for a norm for  The following two are common and are equivalent in the sense of equivalence of norms:

and

With respect to either of these norms,  is a Banach space. For  is also a separable space.

Approximation by smooth functions
It is rather hard to work with Sobolev spaces relying only on their definition. It is therefore interesting to know that by the Meyers–Serrin theorem a function  can be approximated by smooth functions. This fact often allows us to translate properties of smooth functions to Sobolev functions.

Examples

In higher dimensions, it is no longer true that, for example,  contains only continuous functions. For example,  where  is the unit ball in three dimensions. For example, as can be easily checked using spherical polar coordinates for the function  defined on the n-dimensional ball we have:

Intuitively, the blow-up of f at 0 "counts for less" when n is large since the unit ball has "more outside and less inside" in higher dimensions.

Absolutely continuous on lines (ACL) characterization of Sobolev functions
The ACL characterization of the Sobolev spaces was established by Otto M. Nikodym (1933); see .

In particular, if  and  has Lipschitz boundary, then the function is Lipschitz continuous.

Functions vanishing at the boundary 

When  has a regular boundary,  can be described as the space of functions in  that vanish at the boundary, in the sense of traces (see below).

When  is bounded, the Poincaré inequality states that there is a constant  such that:

This fact plays a role in the study of the Dirichlet problem, and in the fact that there exists an orthonormal basis of  consisting of eigenvectors of the Laplace operator (with Dirichlet boundary condition).

Traces

Sobolev spaces are often considered when investigating partial differential equations. It is essential to consider boundary values of Sobolev functions. The following theorem resolves the problem:

Tu is called the trace of u. Roughly speaking, this theorem extends the restriction operator to the Sobolev space  for well-behaved Ω. Note that the trace operator T is in general not surjective, but for 1 < p < ∞ it maps continuously onto the Sobolev–Slobodeckij space 

Intuitively, taking the trace costs 1/p of a derivative. The functions u in W1,p(Ω) with zero trace, i.e. Tu = 0, can be characterized by the equality

where

In other words, for Ω bounded with Lipschitz boundary, trace-zero functions in  can be approximated by smooth functions with compact support.

Sobolev spaces with non-integer k

Bessel potential spaces
For a natural number k and  one can show (by using Fourier multipliers) that the space  can equivalently be defined as

with the norm

This motivates Sobolev spaces with non-integer order since in the above definition we can replace k by any real number s. The resulting spaces

are called Bessel potential spaces (named after Friedrich Bessel). They are Banach spaces in general and Hilbert spaces in the special case p = 2.

Again, Hs,p(Ω) is a Banach space and in the case p = 2 a Hilbert space.

By the embeddings

the Bessel potential spaces  form a continuous scale between the Sobolev spaces  From an abstract point of view, the Bessel potential spaces occur as complex interpolation spaces of Sobolev spaces, i.e. in the sense of equivalent norms it holds that

where:

Sobolev–Slobodeckij spaces

Another approach to define fractional order Sobolev spaces arises from the idea to generalize the Hölder condition to the Lp-setting. For  and  the Slobodeckij seminorm (roughly analogous to the Hölder seminorm) is defined by

Let  be not an integer and set . Using the same idea as for the Hölder spaces, the Sobolev–Slobodeckij space  is defined as

It is a Banach space for the norm

If  is suitably regular in the sense that there exist certain extension operators, then also the Sobolev–Slobodeckij spaces form a scale of Banach spaces, i.e. one has the continuous injections or embeddings

From an abstract point of view, the spaces  coincide with the real interpolation spaces of Sobolev spaces, i.e. in the sense of equivalent norms the following holds:

Sobolev–Slobodeckij spaces play an important role in the study of traces of Sobolev functions. They are special cases of Besov spaces.

Extension operators 

  is continuous for any 1 ≤ p ≤ ∞ and integer k.

We will call such an operator A an extension operator for

Case of p = 2

Extension operators are the most natural way to define  for non-integer s (we cannot work directly on  since taking Fourier transform is a global operation). We define  by saying that  if and only if  Equivalently, complex interpolation yields the same  spaces so long as  has an extension operator. If  does not have an extension operator, complex interpolation is the only way to obtain the  spaces.

As a result, the interpolation inequality still holds.

Extension by zero 

Given the definition of a trace, above, we may state the following

If  we may define its extension by zero  in the natural way, namely

For  its extension by zero,

is an element of  Furthermore,

such that for each  a.e. on Ω, Eu has compact support within O, and there exists a constant C depending only on p, Ω, O and the dimension n, such that

Sobolev embeddings

It is a natural question to ask if a Sobolev function is continuous or even continuously differentiable. Roughly speaking, sufficiently many weak derivatives (i.e. large k) result in a classical derivative. This idea is generalized and made precise in the Sobolev embedding theorem.

Write  for the Sobolev space of some compact Riemannian manifold of dimension n. Here k can be any real number, and 1 ≤ p ≤ ∞. (For p = ∞ the Sobolev space  is defined to be the Hölder space Cn,α where k = n + α and 0 < α ≤ 1.) The Sobolev embedding theorem states that if  and  then

and the embedding is continuous. Moreover, if  and  then the embedding is completely continuous (this is sometimes called Kondrachov's theorem or the Rellich–Kondrachov theorem). Functions in  have all derivatives of order less than m continuous, so in particular this gives conditions on Sobolev spaces for various derivatives to be continuous. Informally these embeddings say that to convert an Lp estimate to a boundedness estimate costs 1/p derivatives per dimension.

Sobolev embeddings on  that are not compact often have a related, but weaker,  property of cocompactness.

See also 
Sobolev mapping

Notes

References
 .
 .

.
.
.
.
.
.
; translation of Mat. Sb., 4  (1938)  pp. 471–497.
.
.
.
.

External links
 Eleonora Di Nezza, Giampiero Palatucci, Enrico Valdinoci (2011). "Hitchhiker's guide to the fractional Sobolev spaces".

Sobolev spaces
Fourier analysis
Fractional calculus
Function spaces